Dashtesare Sofla Rural District is a rural district (dehestan) in the Central District of Amol County, Mazandaran Province, Iran. The rural district has 15 villages.

References 

Rural Districts of Mazandaran Province
Amol County